Julbach is a village and municipality in the district of Rottal-Inn in Bavaria in Germany. In addition to the village of Julbach, the municipality includes 16 other settlements.

References

Rottal-Inn